Inês de Saint-Maurice Esteves de Medeiros Victorino de Almeida (born 15 April 1968) is a Portuguese actress and politician. She won a Golden Globe in 1996. A member of the Socialist Party, she was a deputy in the Assembly of the Republic from 2009 to 2016, and mayor of Almada from 2017.

Early life and acting
Medeiros was born in Vienna, Austria, where her father António Victorino de Almeida was a conductor, while her mother Maria Armanda Esteves was a journalist. Her sister Maria is also an actress. The family moved regularly until the Carnation Revolution in Portugal in 1974; they settled in Lisbon the year after. She studied two years of Portuguese literature at the New University of Lisbon but did not graduate; she then studied theatre for two years at Sorbonne University.

Medeiros made her cinematic debut in 1981's A Culpa, directed by her father. In 1996, she won a Golden Globe.

Politics
In the October 2009 elections, Medeiros was elected to the Assembly of the Republic for the Lisbon District, representing the Socialist Party (PS). She commuted to the legislature from her home in Paris, with the tickets being reimbursed by the state as if they were flights between Lisbon and the Azores, €620 return. This was in agreement with pre-existing legislation around deputies from that archipelago. PS parliamentary leader Francisco Assis said of the matter "On a scale of zero to 100 of the main problems in this country [with zero as the highest], this subject must come 300th". She was re-elected in 2011 and 2015, the latter time by the Setúbal District.

In the 2017 municipal elections, Medeiros became mayor of Almada after forming a coalition with the Social Democratic Party; the result ended the hegemony of the Communist Party that had existed in the city since the first democratic elections in 1976. She won a second term in 2021, ahead of the former three-term Communist mayor of nearby Setúbal, Maria das Dores Meira.

In late 2022, the Almada local government led by Medeiros began the demolition of the Bairro do Segundo Torrão, a shanty town in Trafaria inhabited mainly by immigrants. The reason given was that drainage problems could have caused the buildings to collapse. The decision was condemned by Amnesty International. Medeiros said that residents had been put in emergency accommodation in Almada or Lisbon hotels until housing contracts could be finalised. The deadline for leaving before demolition was 30 September; houses collapsed into the drainage ditch due to heavy rains on 20 October.

References

1968 births
Living people
Actresses from Vienna
Actresses from Lisbon
Portuguese film actresses
Socialist Party (Portugal) politicians
Members of the Assembly of the Republic (Portugal)
Women members of the Assembly of the Republic (Portugal)
Mayors of places in Portugal
Women mayors of places in Portugal